Lois Dorothy Daish  is a New Zealand restaurateur, food writer and cookbook author.

Biography 
Daish was born in Wellington, New Zealand and grew up in the suburb of Roseneath. While young, her family moved to New York for two years as her father had a job at the United Nations. This early exposure to American food influenced her interest and taste in food in later years.

In the 1960s, Daish cooked at the Downstage Theatre, and later worked at a bohemian cafe, The Settlement.

In the 1970s, Daish wrote articles for a friend's newspaper in the western suburbs of Wellington; most were on town planning issues, but Daish convinced her friend to include a food column and she wrote food articles for the newspaper as well.

In the 1980s, Daish owned several Wellington restaurants: Number 9 on Bowen St for four years, followed by the Mount Cook Café from 1984 to 1989, and then the Brooklyn Café & Grill. In 1984 she began writing a food column for the New Zealand Listener magazine. For the first ten years she wrote alternate weeks with Annabel Langbein, and from 1994 she wrote the column every week. She retired from the Listener in 2009. In 1987, she was a founding member of the New Zealand Guild of Food Writers.

Publications 
 Good Food: Recipes from the Listener (1989),  
 Dinner at Home (1993), co-written with Geoffrey Notman, Bridget Williams Books,  
 Fuss-Free Food for Two (1997),  
 A Good Year (2005), Random House New Zealand,

Honours and awards
In the 1997 New Year Honours, Daish was appointed a Member of the New Zealand Order of Merit, for services to the food industry. In 2010, she was elected a life member of the New Zealand Guild of Food Writers.

References

Living people
People from Wellington City
20th-century New Zealand businesswomen
20th-century New Zealand businesspeople
21st-century New Zealand businesswomen
21st-century New Zealand businesspeople
Cookbook writers
Women cookbook writers
Members of the New Zealand Order of Merit
New Zealand restaurateurs
Women restaurateurs
New Zealand columnists
New Zealand food writers
Women food writers
20th-century New Zealand women writers
21st-century New Zealand women writers
New Zealand women columnists
Year of birth missing (living people)